Dabengwa is a surname. Notable people with the surname include:

Dumiso Dabengwa (1939–2019), Zimbabwean politician
Keith Dabengwa (born 1980), Zimbabwean cricketer

Surnames of African origin